Canning College is a specialist international education institution delivering programs that provide international students with pathways into universities. It delivers programs for Year 10, Year 11, Year 12 (WA Certificate of Education and WA Universities' Foundation Program), Certificate IV (in University Access Program) and Diploma of Commerce.

Established in 1982 by the WA Department of Education, the college initially provided secondary and tertiary-preparation education for domestic and fee-paying international students completing senior secondary programs or their equivalent. Since 2019 the college has provided education to fee-paying international students only. In 2017, Canning College provided education to approximately 400 international students from approximately twelve countries.

Programs 
Canning College provides a number of education programs:

 Western Australian Universities Foundation Program (WAUFP)
 Western Australian Certificate of Education (Year 12)
 Certificate IV (University Access Program)
 Diploma of Commerce
 University of Western Australia stream
 Curtin University stream
 Year 11 Secondary studies
 Year 10 Secondary studies
 Bridging programs

See also

 List of schools in the Perth metropolitan area
 List of Australian tertiary institutions

References

External links 
Canning College website

Public high schools in Perth, Western Australia
Australian tertiary institutions
Adult education in Australia
Educational institutions established in 1982
Bentley, Western Australia
1982 establishments in Australia